Phạm Văn Thành can refer to:

 Phạm Văn Thành (footballer) (born 1994), Vietnamese footballer
 Phạm Văn Thành (swimmer) (born 1958), Vietnamese swimmer